Epidendrum orchidiflorum  is a species of orchid of the genus Epidendrum.

Description 
The flat, coriaceous distichous leaves are ovate-oblong and obtuse. The stout, ~3 dm long, terminal peduncle is covered with rough imbricate sheathes and ends in a short raceme of green flowers. The dorsal sepal is obovate, and the lateral sepals are oblong. The two petals are linear-subcuneate. The subrotund lip has two calli at the base, and is tridentate at the apex; the middle tooth is smaller than the lateral teeth.

Synonyms 
 E. caespitosum Barb.Rodr. (1877) nom. illeg.
 E. huebneri Schltr. (1925)
 E. acrirachis Pabst (1955)
 E. garayanum A.D.Hawkes (1957) nom. illeg.

References

External links 
There is a picture at https://web.archive.org/web/20090429111228/http://www.orchidstudium.com/Estrangeiras/Epidendrum%20orchidflorum.html

orchidiflorm
Endemic orchids of Brazil
Orchids of Bahia
Plants described in 1831